is a passenger railway station in the city of Kisarazu, Chiba Prefecture, Japan, operated by the East Japan Railway Company (JR East).

Lines

Station layout
The station consists of one side platform serving a single bidirectional track. The station is unattended.

History
The station opened on October 2, 1978, as a temporary stop on the Japanese National Railways (JNR) Kururi Line. It was absorbed into the JR East network upon the privatization of JNR on April 1, 1987, and elevated to full station status at the same time.
In fiscal 2006, the station was used by an average of 48 passengers daily.

Passenger statistics
In fiscal 2006, the station was used by an average of 86 passengers daily.]

Surrounding area
 
 Obitsu River

See also
 List of railway stations in Japan

References

External links

  

Railway stations in Japan opened in 1978
Railway stations in Chiba Prefecture
Kururi Line
Stations of East Japan Railway Company
Kisarazu